Sunshine Sketches, also known as Addison Spotlight Theatre, is a Canadian dramatic television series which aired on CBC Television from 1952 to 1953. It was the first English-language drama to be broadcast on Canadian television.

Premise
The series was an adaptation of Sunshine Sketches of a Little Town by Stephen Leacock. Don Harron and Henry Kaplan wrote the episodes from this material. It was later titled Addison Spotlight Theatre for its sponsor, an automobile dealer.

The series was filmed in Beaverton, Ontario.

Cast
 Timothy Findley as Peter Pupkin
 Peggi Loder as Zena Pepperleigh
 Eric House as Dean Drone
 Peg Dixon as Lillian Drone
 Frank Perry as Mallory Tompkins
 Paul Kligman as Josh Smith
 Gerry Sarracini as the poet
 Barbara Hamilton as the poet's wife
 Gerry Campbell as the drugstore clerk
 John Drainie as narrator
 Robert Christie as Golgotha Gingham
 Hugh Webster as Shorty

Scheduling
This half-hour series was broadcast on Tuesdays at 7:30 p.m. from 9 September 1952 to 31 March 1953. Its debut marked the first Canadian broadcast of an English-language dramatic series.

References

External links

 
 

CBC Television original programming
1952 Canadian television series debuts
1953 Canadian television series endings
1950s Canadian comedy-drama television series
Black-and-white Canadian television shows